Cold Lake 149 is an Indian reserve of the Cold Lake First Nations in Alberta, located within the Municipal District of Bonnyville No. 87. It is 26 kilometers east of Bonnyville. In the 2016 Canadian Census, it recorded a population of 671 living in 208 of its 222 total private dwellings.

References

Indian reserves in Alberta